Art Ensemble of Chicago with Fontella Bass is a 1970 album by the Art Ensemble of Chicago recorded in Paris  and released on the America label in 1971 then reissued in the US on Prestige Records the following year. It features performances by Lester Bowie, Joseph Jarman, Roscoe Mitchell, Malachi Favors Maghostut, Fontella Bass, and Don Moye.

Reception
Robert Palmer's Rolling Stone review stated "The music works very much like a film, in sequences. Certain instruments and ideas carry over from one sequence to another, but something new is always being added as something else is subtracted. There are successions of episodes, of colours, meshes of tones and ideas, washes of sound. There is no soloing as such. Each player is a virtuoso on his main horns, but the virtuosity is channeled into a true ensemble approach."
The Allmusic review by Thom Jurek states "Bass, an R&B and gospel singer by trade and Lester Bowie's wife at the time, adds a wonderful theatrical and sonic dimension to the Art Ensemble's creative juggernaut... This set stands the test of time beautifully".

Track listing 
 "How Strange/Ole Jed" (Art Ensemble of Chicago) - 21:57
 "Horn Web" (Roscoe Mitchell) - 19:39

Personnel 
 Lester Bowie: trumpet, percussion instruments
 Malachi Favors Maghostut: bass, percussion instruments, vocals
 Joseph Jarman: saxophones, clarinets, percussion instruments
 Roscoe Mitchell: saxophones, clarinets, flute, percussion instruments
 Fontella Bass: vocals, piano
 Don Moye: drums, percussion

References 

1970 albums
America Records albums
Art Ensemble of Chicago albums